Digama meridionalis is a moth of the family Erebidae first described by Charles Swinhoe in 1907. It is found in much of southern and eastern Africa.

Subspecies
Digama meridionalis deliae Berio, 1939 (Ethiopia, Eritrea)
Digama meridionalis meridionalis Swinhoe, 1907 (South Africa, Zimbabwe)
Digama meridionalis thamaritica Wiltshire, 1986 (Oman, Saudi Arabia, Yemen)

References

External links
Zwier, Jaap "Sommeria meridionalis meridionalis Swinhoe 1907". Aganainae (Snouted Tigers). Retrieved April 18, 2020.

Aganainae
Moths of Africa
Moths described in 1907